Abdul Hamid Karami (23 October 1890 – 23 November 1950) was a Lebanese political and religious leader, who had nationalistic Arab inclinations.

Biography
Karami descended from one of the most prominent Sunni Muslim families in Lebanon. Members

 f his family traditionally held the position of mufti of Tripoli. Abdul Hamid Karami became mufti of Tripoli, but was removed by the French authorities. He was a leader of the movement to have Lebanon become an independent country, a goal which was achieved by 1943. In 1944, Karami survived an assassination attempt, which was due to a local rivalry in Tripoli. Karami served as prime minister and finance minister of Lebanon for a brief period from 10 January 1945 to 20 August 1945. He also held the post of defense minister for that time.

His sons, Rashid Karami and Omar Karami were also important Lebanese politicians who served as prime ministers and leading politicians of Lebanon. Karami died on 3 November 1950.

Controversy
In June 1935, Karami killed Abdul Majid Muqaddam, another prominent Tripoli native, since Muqaddam had beaten him with a stick and knocked off his turban. However, Karami was acquitted due to his claim of self-defense. Karami's lawyer was future president Bishara Khoury.

References

External links

1890 births
1950 deaths
Prime Ministers of Lebanon
Defense ministers of Lebanon
Lebanese Sunni Muslims
Members of the Parliament of Lebanon
Government ministers of Lebanon
People from Tripoli, Lebanon
Finance ministers of Lebanon